Ammore e malavita is a 2017 Italian  musical comedy film directed by the Manetti Bros. It was screened in the main competition section of the 74th Venice International Film Festival.

Cast

 Claudia Gerini as Donna Maria
 Carlo Buccirosso as don Vincenzo
 Serena Rossi as Fatima
 Giampaolo Morelli as Ciro
  as Rosary
  as Gennaro
  as Uncle Mimmo
 Giovanni Esposito as Rival boss
 Ivan Granatino as  Young killer
 Giuseppe "The King" Danza as Killer of the rival boss
 Claudia Federica Petrella as Mariellina
  as Caregiver
  as Doctor
  as Acquaintance of Fatima
  as Stationer
 Ronnie Marmo as Frank Strozzalone
 Stefano Moffa as Police Inspector
  as Sister of Don Vincenzo
  as Mother of Don Vincenzo
 Antonio Fiorillo as Grandson of Don Vincenzo
  as Lawyer
 Mario Rivelli as Young policeman
 Andrea D'Alessio as Tourist guide
 Tia Architto as American tourist
  as Master
 Antonello Cossia as Antonello

Awards

References

External links
 

2017 films
2010s musical comedy films
2010s Italian-language films
2017 comedy films
Italian musical comedy films
Films directed by the Manetti Bros.
2010s Italian films